The Trekking K2 is a family of French single-place and two-place paragliders that was designed and produced by Trekking Parapentes of Lambesc. Introduced in 2002, the model range is now out of production.

Design and development
The K2 was designed as a mountaineering descent glider and named for K2, the mountain located on the China-Pakistan border. The glider models are each named for their relative size.

Variants
K2 M
Mid-sized model for medium-weight pilots. The glider model is AFNOR Standard certified.
K2 L
Large-sized model for heavier pilots. The glider model is AFNOR Standard certified.
K2 XL
Extra large-sized model for even heavier pilots. The glider model is AFNOR Standard certified.
K2 Bi
Identical to the K2 XL, but rigged to carry two people in tandem and as such was referred to as the K2 Bi, indicating "bi-place" or two seater. The glider model is AFNOR Bi-Place certified.

Specifications (K2 M)

References

K2
Paragliders